Hereford is an unincorporated community in Meade County, in the U.S. state of South Dakota.

History
A post office called Hereford was established in 1894, and remained in operation until 1985. The community was so named for the Hereford cattle which grazed on the prairie.

References

Unincorporated communities in Meade County, South Dakota
Unincorporated communities in South Dakota